Craik-Patton House is a historic home located at Charleston, West Virginia.  It was built by James Craik and his wife, Juliet Shrewsbury, in 1834 in the Greek Revival style.  It was originally located on Virginia Street in Charleston, but moved to its present site in 1973 to save it from the threat of demolition.  It features four massive columns that support the extended center roof with pilasters placed above the front facade.  It was faithfully restored and preserved for the public by the National Society of the Colonial Dames of America in the state of West Virginia and open for tours year round.

Though originally named "Elm Grove" the house is now called the Craik-Patton House in honor of Rev. James Craik who built the house, who was the grandson and namesake of George Washington's physician, Dr. James Craik. The Patton aspect of the name comes from Col. George S. Patton, grandfather of WWII hero George Patton, who lived in the house with his family from 1858 until his passing.

The Craik Patton House also features attractions of interest relating to several other prominent families of the Charleston region. Most notably among these are the Ruffner Log House which is located on the museum property. Within the house itself can be found artifacts not only of the two families it takes its name from, however also objects relating to the Kanwha Valley's role in local history.

It was listed on the National Register of Historic Places in 1970.

Gallery

References

External links

http://www.craik-patton.org

Greek Revival houses in West Virginia
Historic American Buildings Survey in West Virginia
Historic house museums in West Virginia
Houses completed in 1834
Houses in Charleston, West Virginia
Houses on the National Register of Historic Places in West Virginia
Museums in Charleston, West Virginia
National Register of Historic Places in Charleston, West Virginia
Patton family
National Society of the Colonial Dames of America
Ruffner family